Penthouse HDTV (or simply known as Penthouse HD) is an adult entertainment channel primarily broadcasting in high-definition format. For over 40 years, Penthouse has published the Penthouse magazine and directed and produced movies, video games, sports, and gadgets. Penthouse has created three HDTV channels available in Europe.

History 
Penthouse have created adult erotic movies for many years, moving towards pornographic movies in 1998, and to High-definition in 2006. Since then they have filmed exclusively in HD format. In October 2009, Penthouse HDTV launched their new HDTV channels in Europe, three of which contain high definition pornographic adult content.

Technical information relating to HDTV

Satellites 
Penthouse HDTV broadcasts its channels via one of the Eutelsat satellites. Access to the HD channels is via the use of a set-top box and a smart card reaching territories across the entire geographical region of Europe. The Penthouse HDTV channels can also be viewed with existing Hot Bird equipment with the help of dual feed solutions such as monoblock LNB equipment, double LNB equipment and the ClipSat device. The dual feed equipment works for reception equipment of the Eurobird 9A at 9° east as well as the Hot Bird at 13° east.

Penthouse HDTV channels 
Penthouse launched three HD channels in Europe in 2009. Penthouse HDTV channels are the first completely HD adult specific content channels in Europe. Three channels broadcast 24 hours per day.
 Penthouse Passion softcore content. 
 Penthouse Gold hardcore content. 
 Penthouse Quickies hardcore content. 
 Penthouse Black hardcore content. 
 Penthouse Naughty Nights  
 Penthouse After Midnight  
All channels show movies and clips from the Penthouse brands.

The Penthouse HDTV channels are DTH (Direct-to-Home), IPTV and cable channels.

See also 
 List of adult television channels

References

External links 
 Penthouse HDTV official website

Pornographic television channels
Television channels and stations established in 2009
HD-only channels